Øster Kippinge is a village  west of Nørre Alslev on the Danish island of Falster. As of 2022, it has a population of 269.

History
The spring near Kippinge Church to the northwest of the village has attracted pilgrims for centuries, possibly even before the church was built in the Middle Ages. Known as Sankt Søren's spring, it is probably the second most famous in Denmark. Pilgrims continued to visit Kipplinge, not just for the spring but above all for "the Holy Sacrament", a few drops of the blood of Jesus which the historian Arild Huitfeldt ascribes to a miracle in the church in 1492. Among those who visited Kipplinge were King Olaf in the late 14th century and Christian II in the beginning of the 16th century, who was always short of funds. During the wars with Sweden, he borrowed money from Kipplinge Church or several occasions thanks to the substantial gifts left by pilgrims.

The village today
The village is largely a residential community but it also has a small firm which manufactures steel stacks and ventilation chimneys.

References

Falster
Cities and towns in Region Zealand
Guldborgsund Municipality